The Canon EOS-1D C is an 18.1-megapixel CMOS digital single-lens reflex camera (digital SLR) made by Canon in the Cinema EOS range. The Canon EOS-1D C is stated to be the world's first 4K resolution DSLR camera.

The 1D C has a full frame sensor but uses an APS-H-sized portion to record 4K resolution (4096 x 2160 pixels) video at 24p and 25p without downscaling in Y'CbCr 4:2:2 format. The pixel size of the sensor is 6.95 μm and records 4K in 8-bit 4:2:2 using Motion JPEG. The other modes in 8-bit 4:2:0, using MPEG-4 AVC/H.264 IBP or ALL-I format. Uncompressed video over HDMI up to 1080p is also possible.

In November 2013, Canon announced that the 1D C was the first DSLR to meet the European Broadcasting Union HD Tier 1 requirements for use in HD broadcast production.

In an interview in February 2016, Canon Product Manager Roger Machin announced that the 1D C would be succeeded by the 1D X Mark II; however, the 1D X Mk II lacks the unlimited recording, and log gamma found on the 1D C.

Features
The Canon EOS-1D C can use more than sixty interchangeable Canon lenses, and features the Canon Log Gamma, by which an estimated preview of footage after grading helps the videographer with focusing and determining exposure whilst retaining maximum latitude in captured image data. An ISO setting range from 50 to 204,800 can be selected automatically or adjusted manually. The camera also allows the user to view the LCD screen while the HDMI port is in use on an external device and includes a headphone jack. The 1D C shares the same battery that is used in the EOS-1D X, the LP-E4N. Like all Canon DSLR full frame cameras, the 1D does not feature a built-in flash. EOS Utility and Picture Style Editor software is included in the purchase of the product which enables the user to adjust several settings from a computer. Like the Canon EOS 5D Mark III and Canon EOS-1D X, the camera features 61 autofocus points, which are assisted by a 100,000-pixel metering sensor. The camera's viewfinder has an estimated magnification of .76x and 100% field of view. Remote control from computer is possible using the built-in USB or Ethernet connector.

The camera can be operated remotely with a Canon WFT-E6A Wireless File Transmitter, allowing an external web enabled device to control the camera. The WFT-E6A Wireless File Transmitter unit also enables Bluetooth v2.1 +EDR, to embed GPS location data into files.

Accessories
According to Canon's website, the EOS 1D C model comes equipped with:

 EOS-1D C Body
 Eyecup E.g.
 LP-E4N Battery Pack
 LC-E4N Battery Charger
 Cable Protector and Clamp
 Stereo AV Cable (AVC-DC400ST)
 USB Interface Cable (model IFC-200U)
 Wide Camera Strap L7

Known defects
Canon issued a product advisory indicating that in some units, due to insufficient lubrication within the camera's driving mechanism, "the autofocus searches but does not lock in on the subject" and "the image shown in the viewfinder is "blurry" or "not steady". Any bodies sold with the issue have been recalled by Canon.

Other
On February 1, 2015, Canon reduced the price of the Eos 1D C model by $4,000 from the current price of $11,999 to $7,999. On December 13, 2016, Canon reduced the price of the Eos 1D C model once again by another $3,000 from the current price of $7,999 to $4,999.

See also
Canon EOS-1D X
Canon EOS 5D Mark III
Uncompressed video

References

External links 

 EOS-1D C Cinema EOS Cameras
 Canon EOS-1D C first digital SLR camera to meet EBU HD Tier 1 imaging requirements for broadcast production November 12, 2013, Canon Inc.

1D C
Digital movie cameras
Cameras introduced in 2013
Full-frame DSLR cameras